Almorox is a municipality located in the province of Toledo, Castile-La Mancha, Spain.

According to the 2006 census (INE), the municipality had a population of 2371 inhabitants.

History
The church of San Cristóbal dates from the 16th century.

At the end of the 19th century a railway was constructed from Madrid which terminated at Almorox. It was originally intended to extend the line, but trains stopped running to Almorox in 1966.

References

Municipalities in the Province of Toledo